Leucocroton is a plant genus of the family Euphorbiaceae first described as a genus in 1861. The entire genus is endemic to Cuba. It is a member of the Leucocroton alliance, which also includes Garciadelia and Lasiocroton. Species in this alliance are dioecious.

Species

formerly included
moved to other genera (Garciadelia and Lasiocroton)
 Leucocroton leprosus - Garciadelia leprosa  
 Leucocroton microphyllus - Lasiocroton microphyllus

References

Adelieae
Euphorbiaceae genera
Flora of Cuba
Dioecious plants